Aashiq Biwi Ka is a Hindi language Indian comedy series aired on DD National channel. The series launched on 7 May 2009.

Cast

 Rajeev Verma
 Upasana Singh as Radha Devi/Ghost Mother
 Amita Nangia
 Neelu Kohli
 Rohan Jaywant
 Praveen Yadav
 Riddhima Tiwari as Neeta
 Kurush Deboo as Lawyer Tehmul Tata aka T.T.
 Neelima Parandekar
 Jaineraj Rajpurohit

References

External links
 

DD National original programming
Indian comedy television series
2009 Indian television series debuts